Qennarit is a  local authority/village in the Sidon District in Lebanon. It is located  51 km southeast of Beirut.

History
In 1875, Victor Guérin noted about the village: "Kennarit, a village inhabited by Metualis and which succeeded an ancient locality, as evidenced by a reservoir dug into the rock, several sepulchral caves and ancient quarries."

References

Bibliography

External links
Qennarit, Localiban

Populated places in Sidon District
Shia Muslim communities in Lebanon